The Alfa Romeo D2 was a nine-cylinder radial engine for aircraft use produced in Italy. It was typically rated between 240 and 270 hp.
The engine was designed by Vittorio Jano, 600 units were produced between 1931 and 1934. This engine was also the first purpose-built aircraft engine produced by Alfa Romeo, previous Alfa engines used in aircraft were derived from engines used in cars. A supercharged derivative was produced as the D2 C.30.

Applications
 Breda Ba.25
 Caproni Ca.101
 Caproni Ca.105
 Jona J-6S

Specifications (D2 C.30)

See also

References

D2
1930s aircraft piston engines